Amr Swelim (born June 7, 1984) is a professional squash player who represents Italy. He reached a career-high world ranking of World No. 39 in December 2009.

References

External links 
 
 

Italian male squash players
Living people
1984 births
Sportspeople from Cairo